The Cimetière des Gonards is the largest cemetery in Versailles on the outskirts of Paris. It began operations in 1879.

Description
This is a rurally landscaped cemetery, the upper part of which is laid out with walks and planted with trees. The Devos-Logie and Mirand-Devos Chapels were designed by the architect Hector Guimard in 1894.

There is a section for military graves, including 534 German military graves from the two World Wars, marked by a monument and stelae of pink granite, and a war graves section containing the graves of 181 Commonwealth service personnel of both World Wars. In the highest part is a monument to those French service personnel who are buried in the graveyards of North Africa.

The cemetery also contains a Jewish area (sections "L sud" and "L ouest"), and many English and American Protestant burials.

The notorious executed murderers Henri Désiré Landru and Eugène Weidmann are buried here, in unmarked graves.

Notable burials

 Marc Allégret (1900–1973), film director
 Abolhassan Banisadr (1933–2021), first president of the Islamic Republic of Iran
 Louis Bernard (1864–1955), general
 Louis Blériot (1872–1936), pioneer aviator
 Princess Éléonore-Justine Bonaparte (1832–1905)
 Princess Marie-Félix Bonaparte (1859–1882)
 Prince Pierre Napoleon Bonaparte, (1815–1881)
 Prince Roland Bonaparte (1858–1924)
 Louise Bryant (1885–1936), American journalist and author
 Louis Cartier (1875–1942), jeweller, watchmaker
 Louis-François Cartier (1819–1904), jeweller
 Hélène Dieudonné (1884–1980), actress
 Gabriel Monod (1844–1912), historian
 Robert de Montesquiou (1855–1921), poet, and Gabriel Yturri (1860–1905), his secretary
 Armand Renaud (1836–1895), poet
 Georges Saillard (1877–1967), actor
 Edith Wharton (1862–1937), American writer

Gallery

References

External links
 Le cimetière des Gonards 

Buildings and structures in Yvelines
1879 establishments in France
Cemeteries in Île-de-France
Tourist attractions in Yvelines
Burial sites of the House of Bonaparte